Edwin Sharp Burdell (February 2, 1898 – August 30, 1978)
 was the director (1938-1951) and president (1951-1960) of the Cooper Union for 22 years  and the first dean of the School of Humanities and Social Sciences  at the Massachusetts Institute of Technology.

Burdell left Cooper Union in 1960 to take up an appointment as the first president of Middle East Technical University in Ankara, Turkey.  He was subsequently resident consultant of the Cranbrook Institutes in the early 1960s, where his responsibility was to help coordinate the activities of the six Cranbrook Institutions.

References

External links
 

MIT School of Humanities, Arts, and Social Sciences faculty
1898 births
1978 deaths
Presidents of Cooper Union